The Federal Institute for Drugs and Medical Devices (in German: Bundesinstitut für Arzneimittel und Medizinprodukte – BfArM) is the medical regulatory body in Germany. It operates under the Federal Ministry of Health (BMG). It is headquartered in Bonn, Germany. Its president is Prof. Dr. Karl Broich.

Portfolio of the BMG
Alongside the Paul-Ehrlich-Institut (PEI), the BfArM is one of the two independent federal higher authorities in the German health sector. Further authorities within the portfolio of the BMG are: 
 The Robert-Koch-Institut (RKI) is the Federal Government's central institution in the field of public health responsible for identifying, preventing and combating diseases and serves as the National Institute of Public Health.
 The Paul-Ehrlich-Institut, Federal Institute for Vaccines and Biomedicines, makes an essential contribution to the availability and safety of effective biomedical products.
 Improving the citizens' health is the aim of the Bundeszentrale für gesundheitliche Aufklärung (BZgA) or Federal Centre for Health Education.
 The Deutsches Institut für Medizinische Dokumentation und Information (DIMDI) or German Institute for Medical Documentation and Information is a former agency that was merged into the BfArM in 2020. It offered reliable medical knowledge via the internet, oversaw medical classifications and terminology that are important for health telematics and was responsible for a Health Technology Assessment programme.

History
In 2010 BfArM announced that it will accept pure electronic filings (eCTD or NeeS) from mid-February 2010 (previously a full paper copy was required). Only those documents requiring signature will be required in paper.

See also 
 Agence Nationale de Sécurité du Médicament et des Produits de Santé (ANSM), France
 Medicines and Healthcare products Regulatory Agency (MHRA), UK
 Food and Drug Administration (FDA), USA
 Medicinal Products
 Medical device

References

External links
 www.bfarm.de

Federal authorities in Bonn
Medical and health organisations based in North Rhine-Westphalia
National agencies for drug regulation
Regulation of medical devices
Regulation in Germany